The Valli di Comacchio, meaning "fish basins of Comacchio", are a series of contiguous brackish lagoons situated to the south of Comacchio, close to the Adriatic coast of the Emilia-Romagna region in northern Italy. They lie within the comuni of Comacchio and Argenta in the province of Ferrara and the comune of Ravenna in the province of Ravenna.

The area, covering almost 17,000 hectares within the Parco regionale del Delta del Po, the regional park of the Po Delta, is classified as a Site of Community Importance and a Special Protection Area. It is also rated internationally important by the Ramsar Convention for the conservation and sustainable use of wetlands.

Description 
The Valli di Comacchio are a lagoon and wetland complex comprising four principal basins, The Valle Lido di Magnavacca, the Valle Fossa di Porto, the Valle Campo and the Valle Fattibello, and several smaller ones. The Valle di Bertuzzi is located approximately ten kilometers northward within the Comacchio territory. The lagoon was formed around the tenth century due to subsidence of the soil and silting of the coastal zone. At the time of formation, the area was flooded with fresh water from the recurrent flooding of the rivers. From the sixteenth century on, they gradually were filled with sea water resulting in the modern appearance of brackish water-filled basins.

The original extent of the Valli di Comacchio – covering about 73,000 hectares – was progressively reduced as a result of various land reclamation projects. The current coverage of the wetlands is around 13,000 hectares, from the Comune of Comacchio to the river Reno. The Valli di Comacchio remain some of the largest wetlands in Italy.

Flora 
Oaks, pines, and beech trees are prevalent in higher ground areas, while reeds and tamarisk are common in other parts of the area. Additionally, many types of flowers can be found, including several species of Limonium. In this region there are many pine forests, most notably those of Cervia and Ravenna as well as the Mesola Forest.

Fauna 
The Valli di Comacchio are home to the greatest variety of birds of Italy. There are over 300 species of birds such as flamingos, black-winged stilts, egrets and other herons and kingfishers. In addition, there are fish such as bream, eels, sea bass, mullet, and sole. Foxes are common.

Points of interest 
Fishing is a common occupation: in fact there are still many fishing settlements in the area today. Typical of the area are fishing lodges mounted on poles in the water. These structures serve both as fishing stations and places to monitor for illegal fishing. Also common are eel-fishing basins called lavorieri. There are numerous salt-panning facilities in the area.

See also 
 List of Ramsar wetlands of international importance
 Comacchio

References

External links 

  
 Valli di Comacchio at www.parks.it 
 Valli di Comacchio sul sito del Delta del Po
 La Mappa delle Valli di Comacchio sul sito della Regione Emilia-Romagna

Wetlands of Italy
Regional parks of Italy
Parks in Emilia-Romagna